Riyadh Air is a planned second flag carrier of Saudi Arabia, based in Riyadh, its capital. The airline's main operational base will be at King Khalid International Airport in Riyadh. The airline is planning to be the largest in the Middle East in terms of revenue. It will operate domestic and international scheduled flights to over 100 destinations in the Middle East, Africa, Asia, Europe, South America and North America. The current announced fleet will consist of Airbus A320, Boeing 737, and Boeing 787 aircraft.

According to the Saudi Press Agency (SPA), Riyadh Air will be a company owned by the country's Public Investment Fund (PIF), with Yasir Al-Rumayyan, the governor of PIF, serving as its chairman. Tony Douglas has been appointed as the CEO. He previously served as the CEO of UAE-based airline Etihad from January 2018 until October 2022. Riyadh Air is set to be a 'world-class airline', and is expected to add $20 billion to non-oil GDP growth, and create more than 200,000 direct and indirect jobs.

On 12 March 2023, Crown Prince Mohammed bin Salman formally announced the establishment of Riyadh Air, the country's newest national airline. Two days later, it was announced that the airline had ordered 39 Boeing 787-9, with options for 33 more aircraft.

Fleet

See also
List of airlines of Saudi Arabia

References

Airlines of Saudi Arabia
Airlines established in 2022
Government-owned airlines
Companies based in Riyadh